Mohra Darogha is a village in Rawat, Rawalpindi, Pakistan.

References

Populated places in Murree District